Song In-young (Hangul: 송인영; born 7 January 1990) is a South Korean football player who last played for Home United. He spent single seasons representing J2 League club Roasso Kumamoto and K League 1 club Suwon City before moving to Singapore in 2014 to join Home United – now known as the Lion City Sailors.

Club career

Roasso Kumamoto 
Song briefly joined J.League Division 2 side Roasso Kumamoto in 2011. During his one season stint with the Japanese side, he made a total of 18 competitive appearances for the team, with 12 appearances coming off the bench. He scored 2 goals for the Japanese side.

Suwon City 
Following a short spell with Roasso Kumamoto, Song returned to South Korea and joined Suwon City to partake in the Korea National League for the 2012 season. Song made a total of 11 competitive appearances, with 5 appearances coming off the bench for his club. He scored 2 goals against Cheonan City and Chungju Hummel to secure a 1–2 and 2–1 win respectively for his side.

Club

References

External links
 
 J. League (#32)

South Korean footballers
South Korean expatriate footballers
Roasso Kumamoto players
Suwon FC players
J2 League players
Korea National League players
K League 2 players
South Korean expatriate sportspeople in Japan
Expatriate footballers in Japan
Expatriate footballers in Singapore
Home United FC players
Association football forwards
Singapore Premier League players
1990 births
Living people
Sportspeople from Daejeon